Chat Chat is the debut studio album by Japanese musician Takako Minekawa, released on June 25, 1995 by Polystar.

Track listing

Personnel
Credits are adapted from the album's liner notes.

Musicians

 Takako Minekawa – vocals, guitar, keyboards, toy instruments
 Takashi Furuta – drums
 Yoshie Hiragakura – drums, percussion
 Kōji Kurumatani – guitars
 Takamune Negishi – bass
 Hirofumi Tokutake – acoustic guitar, electric guitar
 Hitoshi Watanabe – acoustic bass, acoustic guitar, cello, mandolin, percussion, ukulele, arrangement
 Eiji Yoshikawa – keyboards, sound manipulation, arrangement
 Toben Yukawa – arrangement

Production

 Takako Minekawa – production
 Kenichi Makimura – production
 Masao Nakazato – mastering
 Daiji Okai – production
 Hiroshi Saisu – mixing, recording
 Yasuhiko Terada – mixing, recording

Design

 Takako Minekawa – art direction
 Mach5 Go! – design
 Yuji Shiba – photography

References

External links
 

1995 debut albums
Takako Minekawa albums